Ogden Channel is a strait on the North Coast of British Columbia, Canada, located between Porcher Island (NW) and Pitt Island (SE). The channel complex is part of the Alexander terrane, and dates between the late silurian and early devonian.

Channel waters contain a significant freshwater component, and the surface water layer of Ogden Channel does not reverse with incoming tides during snowmelt. The channel is an important migration corridor for juvenile sockeye salmon.

Features
Features include:
 Alpha Point
 Comrie Head
 Oona River
 Peter Point
 Skene Cove

References

North Coast of British Columbia
Spanish history in the Pacific Northwest
Channels of British Columbia